Pine Valley is a community and census-designated place (CDP) in the Cuyamaca Mountains of the Mountain Empire area, in  southeastern San Diego County, California. The population was 1,510 at the 2010 census, up from 1,501 at the 2000 census.

Geography
Pine Valley is named for the locally unique strand of Jeffrey pine (Pinus jeffreyi) found along Pine Valley Creek, a seasonal drainage in the foothills of the Laguna Mountains in central San Diego County. Interstate 8 passes east-to-west along the southern border of Pine Valley, and crosses Laguna Summit (altitude ) just to the east of the town. The Sunrise Highway marks the eastern border of the town.

According to the United States Census Bureau Pine Valley is located at  (32.828184, -116.526583), which is near the center of the Pine Valley census-designated place (CDP).

Climate
According to the Köppen Climate Classification system, Pine Valley has a warm-summer Mediterranean climate, abbreviated "Csb" on climate maps. The extreme high temperature is 110F, with the extreme low being −4F. Snow sometimes falls during winter storms, but usually melts rapidly.

Demographics

2010
At the 2010 census Pine Valley had a population of 1,510. The racial makeup of Pine Valley was 1,408 (93.2%) White, 6 (0.4%) African American, 6 (0.4%) Native American, 16 (1.1%) Asian, 1 (0.1%) Pacific Islander, 20 (1.3%) from other races, and 53 (3.5%) from two or more races. Hispanic or Latino of any race were 154 people (10.2%).

The whole population lived in households, no one lived in non-institutionalized group quarters and no one was institutionalized.

There were 610 households, 162 (26.6%) had children under the age of 18 living in them, 367 (60.2%) were opposite-sex married couples living together, 43 (7.0%) had a female householder with no husband present, 30 (4.9%) had a male householder with no wife present.  There were 137 (30.1%) unmarried opposite-sex partnerships, and 6 (1.0%) same-sex married couples or partnerships. 128 households (21.0%) were one person and 49 (8.0%) had someone living alone who was 65 or older. The average household size was 2.48.  There were 440 families (72.1% of households); the average family size was 2.85.

The age distribution was 279 people (18.5%) under the age of 18, 114 people (7.5%) aged 18 to 24, 284 people (18.8%) aged 25 to 44, 630 people (41.7%) aged 45 to 64, and 203 people (13.4%) who were 65 or older.  The median age was 48.3 years. For every 100 females, there were 100.3 males.  For every 100 females age 18 and over, there were 98.2 males.

There were 721 housing units at an average density of 100.9 per square mile, of the occupied units 498 (81.6%) were owner-occupied and 112 (18.4%) were rented. The homeowner vacancy rate was 1.4%; the rental vacancy rate was 5.9%.  1,217 people (80.6% of the population) lived in owner-occupied housing units and 293 people (19.4%) lived in rental housing units.

2000
At the 2000 census there were 1,501 people, 559 households, and 419 families in the CDP. The population density was 212.3 inhabitants per square mile (82.0/km). The racial makeup of the CDP was 94.87% White, 0.67% Native American, 0.53% Asian, 2.27% from other races, and 1.67% from two or more races. Hispanic or Latino of any race were 7.13%.

Of the 559 households 34.5% had children under the age of 18 living with them, 65.5% were married couples living together, 7.0% had a female householder with no husband present, and 24.9% were non-families. 19.3% of households were one person and 6.3% were one person aged 65 or older.  The average household size was 2.69 and the average family size was 3.11.

The age distribution was 25.6% under the age of 18, 5.7% from 18 to 24, 23.3% from 25 to 44, 33.3% from 45 to 64, and 12.1% 65 or older.  The median age was 43 years. For every 100 females, there were 93.2 males.  For every 100 females age 18 and over, there were 91.8 males.

The median household income was $64,265 and the median family income  was $71,949. Males had a median income of $51,940 versus $34,583 for females. The per capita income for the CDP was $24,945.  About 4.7% of families and 3.9% of the population were below the poverty line, including 4.2% of those under age 18 and 6.9% of those age 65 or over.

Politics
In the state legislature Pine Valley is located in the 36th Senate District, represented by Republican Joel Anderson, and in the 71st Assembly District, represented by Republican Randy Voepel.

References

Census-designated places in San Diego County, California
Cuyamaca Mountains
Mountain Empire (San Diego County)
Census-designated places in California